is a village located in Nagano Prefecture, Japan. , the village had an estimated population of 4,009 in 1419 households, and a population density of 19 persons per km². The village office is located at an altitude of 1,185 meters, the highest of any municipality in Japan. Kawakami is famous for its lettuce, as well as the Kawakami breed of dogs, Kawakami Inu.

Geography
Kawakami is located in mountainous eastern Nagano Prefecture, bordered by Yamanashi Prefecture to the south, Gunma Prefecture to the north and Saitama Prefecture to the east. Mount Kinpu (2499 meters) is partly located within this village. The source of the Chikuma River, the longest river in Japan, is in Kawakami. This fact is a point of local pride, as it appears in various school songs.

Much of the village is within the borders of the Chichibu Tama Kai National Park.

Surrounding municipalities
 Nagano Prefecture
Minamimaki
 Minamiaiki
 Yamanashi Prefecture
 Hokuto
 Kōfu
 Yamanashi
Saitama Prefecture
 Chichibu
Gunma Prefecture
 Ueno

Climate
The village has a humid continental climate characterized by cool summers, and cold, wet winters (Köppen climate classification Dfb).  The average annual temperature in Kawakami is 4.7 °C. The average annual rainfall is 1954 mm with September as the wettest month. The temperatures are highest on average in August, at around 23.5 °C, and lowest in January, at around -1.3 °C.

Demographics 
Per Japanese census data, while remaining  relatively stable historically, in recent years, the population of Kawakami has been declining.

History
The area of present-day Kawakami was part of ancient Shinano Province. Ruins from the Jomon period, Kofun period and Nara period have been found within the village borders, indicating continuous settlement for thousands of years. The present village of Kawakami was created with the establishment of the modern municipalities system on April 1, 1889.

Economy
Agriculture, particularly the cultivation of lettuce, and forestry are mainstays of the local economy.

Education
Kawakami has two public elementary schools and one public middle school operated by the village government. The village does not have a high school.

Transportation

Railway
 East Japan Railway Company - Koumi Line

Highway
The village is not on any national highway

Local attractions
Ōmiyama ruins, traces of a Jōmon-period settlement; a National Historic Site

Noted people from Kawakami
Kimiya Yui – JAXA astronaut
Aaamyyy - electronic musician and member of Tempalay.

References

External links

Official Website 

 
Villages in Nagano Prefecture